Devudu Chesina Manushulu is a 1973 Indian Telugu-language action-drama film directed by V. Ramachandra Rao, produced by G. Hanumantha Rao under the Padmalaya Studios banner and presented by Krishna. The film stars N. T. Rama Rao, Krishna, Jayalalitha and Vijaya Nirmala, with music composed by Ramesh Naidu. The film was a commercial success, and was remade in Hindi as Takkar (1980) under the same banner.

Plot 
The film begins with notorious gangsters who steal valuable antique idols from the temples. Ramu (N. T. Rama Rao) a valiant is one among them. Once, they hijack an aircraft holding a precious idol when Suresh (Kanta Rao) a mobster, slays out a priest (Malladi). As it happens, a passenger Sujatha (Jayalalitha), sister of a millionaire Hari Prasad (Jaggayya) braves which influences Ramu. So, he safeguards the passengers, in that mishap Ramu & Sujatha fall in love. Thereafter, dropping Sujatha Ramu forwards and lands at an estate owned by Zamindar Dasaradharamayya (S.V. Ranga Rao). Gopi (Krishna) a vagabond, son of Dasaradharamayya leads a carefree life. At a point, he teases a laborer Vijaya (Vijaya Nirmala) when Ramu obstructs. In that rage, Gopi hits Ramu hard and Dasaradharamayya stops it. Thereby, Ramu realizes himself as Rama Krishna, the long-lost son of Dasaradharamayya but considering the uncertainties he stands back. Ramu is the stepson of Dasaradharamayya’s wife Varalakshmi Devi (S. Varalakshmi) who grudges against him. Moreover, her sly brother Papa Rao (Sakshi Ranga Rao) kindled her envy and intrigued her to eliminate Ramu from which he escapes. At present, Dasaradharamayya accommodates Ramu and also entrusts the household responsibilities. Thereupon, he seeks to remove the flaws of Gopi and his sister Geeta (Kanchana) which makes Gopi quit the house. Destiny makes Zamindar & Vinod’s families friends including Sujatha & Geeta. Further, it reunites Ramu & Sujatha when he divulges the entire story and requests her to maintain silence. Besides, Vijaya suffers from her sick mother Ramanamma (Nirmalamma) & drunkard brother Ranganna (Satyanarayana). Gopi aspires to possess her but he reforms by her virtue. Here, as a flabbergast, Hari Prasad turns into the quarterback of gangsters, and Geeta is also associated with them by bullying. Exploiting it, they heist ‘’Lord Krishna’s’’ idol from Dasaradharamayya’s residence. Witnessing it, Ramu indicts himself to save Geeta. Right now, Hari Prasad seizes Geeta when Ramu breaks the bars and chases them. However, Gopi misinterprets and charges Ramu when he affirms his identity and they fuse.  Parallelly, Ranganna senses the activities of Hari Prasad and informs Ramu & Gopi. Being cognizant of it, Sujatha too joins, all reach the base camp, and rescue Geeta. At that moment, surprisingly, it is uncovered that the real Hari Prasad is different from whom the quarterback abducted and purported to the world.  Since he is a beau of Geeta, the gangsters made her a puppet at their fingertips. Just the blackguards ploys a conspiracy in the name of god to smuggle the adored idols out of the country. At last, Ramu & Gopi intrepidly encounters and ceases them. Finally, the movie ends on a happy note with the reunion of family and the marriages of Ramu & Sujatha, Gopi & Vijaya, and Hari Prasad & Geeta.

Cast

Soundtrack 
Music composed by Ramesh Naidu.

Reception 
Giddaluri Gopal Rao, writing for Zamin Ryot on 24 August 1973, gave the film a mixed review. Although he praised the production and cinematography, Rao criticised the film for its unrealistic scenes and poorly written characters. The film was commercially successful and ran for more than 175 days in two centres, Vijayawada and Nellore. The song "Masaka Masaka Cheekatilo" sung by L. R. Eswari and pictured on actress Kanchana became popular.

References

External links 
 

1970s action drama films
1970s Telugu-language films
1973 films
Films scored by Ramesh Naidu
Indian action drama films
Telugu films remade in other languages